Lana Jones is an Australian retired ballet dancer. She was a principal dancer with The Australian Ballet, and danced with the company for 16 years.

Early life and training
Jones was born in Coffs Harbour, but soon relocated to Canberra. She started her ballet training at the Canberra Youth Ballet School, where her principal trainer was Lorraine Bennett. Lana competed in the Genée Awards in London at the end of 1998, gaining a silver medal, In 1999, she relocated to Melbourne to train at the Australian Ballet School and graduated in 2002.

Career
Jones joined The Australian Ballet in 2002. She was named to coryphée in 2005, and principal artist in 2005. During her time at the company, she has danced Princess Aurora in The Sleeping Beauty, the title role in Cinderella and the title role in The Firebird.

Outside of The Australian Ballet, she made guest appearances in different companies, including galas of Northern Ballet, Singapore Dance Theatre and West Australian Ballet, as well as in Hong Kong Ballet's Rubies.

Jones retired from the Australian Ballet in 2019.

Selected repertoire
The Firebird in The Firebird
Cinderella in Alexei Ratmansky’s Cinderella
Kitri in Rudolf Nureyev’s Don Quixote
Odette/Odile in Stephen Baynes’ Swan Lake
Manon in Kenneth MacMillan’s Manon
Giselle in Maina Gielgud’s Giselle
Odette and Baroness von Rothbart in Graeme Murphy’s Swan Lake
Aurora in David McAllister's The Sleeping Beauty
Pas de deux from After the Rain
Apollo

Sources:

Awards
Lissa Black Scholarship 2010
Khitercs Hirai Foundation Scholarship 2009
Australian Dance Award for outstanding performance by a female dancer in 'The Firebird 2009
Green Room Award for best female dancer in The Firebird 2009
Helpmann Award for best female dancer in The Firebird 2009
Helpmann Award for best female dancer in Forgotten Land'' 2006
Freda May Irving Scholarship 2006

Personal life
Jones is married to fellow Australian Ballet principal artist Daniel Gaudiello. They have a son and two dogs. Outside of ballet, Jones enjoy photography and jet skiing.

References

External links
Lana Jones - Australian Ballet profile
Meet our Principal Artist Lana Jones
Principal Artist Lana Jones Takes a Final Bow in 2018

Australian ballerinas
Australian Ballet principal dancers
Living people
People from Canberra
1980s births
21st-century ballet dancers
21st-century Australian dancers
Australian Ballet School alumni
Telstra Ballet Dancer Award winners